Angela Thoko Didiza (born 2 June 1965) is a South African politician currently serving as Minister of Agriculture, Land Reform and Rural Development. She held the post of Minister of Agriculture and Land Affairs from 17 June 1999 to 22 May 2006 and later Minister of Public Works from 22 May 2006 to 25 September 2008.

Didiza was born in the city of Durban and holds a BA (Hons) degree in politics. She is married and has five children.

Following the resignation of President Thabo Mbeki in September 2008, Didiza was one of ten ministers who submitted their resignations on 23 September, although it was subsequently announced that she might be willing to remain in her post.

On 20 June 2016 the ANC announced that Didiza will be their mayoral candidate for the City of Tshwane in the upcoming municipal elections of 2016.  This announcement sparked a wave of rioting in the City of Tshwane against her appointment leading to the deaths of 5 people and the arrest of 40 more.

References

1965 births
Living people
People from Durban
Agriculture and land affairs ministers of South Africa
Members of the National Assembly of South Africa
African National Congress politicians
Women government ministers of South Africa
Women members of the National Assembly of South Africa